Alscot Park is an English Grade I listed Georgian country house in Preston on Stour, some 3 miles (5 km) south of Stratford-upon-Avon, Warwickshire. It was built in a Rococo Gothic style for James West in the early 18th century.

The house itself is built of limestone ashlar to a T-shaped plan with a hipped slate roof and has a two-storey frontage of 7 bays. It stands in 4000 acres of park and farmland, which is Grade II listed and bisected by the River Stour. Several other associated buildings, such as stables and entrance lodges, are also listed. A number of former features of the estate, such as pleasure grounds, an obelisk and a Chinese pavilion have since been lost.

History

In 1747 James West bought the manors, then secretary to the Chancellor of the Exchequer and the MP for St Albans. Pending his retirement from his final post as Secretary to the Treasury in 1762 he created the present house in two stages from an older house on the site. The north wing was remodelled in 1747 and the south wing added in 1762. Stables and a conservatory were added between 1762 and 1766.

A gothic entrance porch was later (1815 to 1820) designed and added to the south front. Gothic lodges at the Stratford Road entrance were built in 1838.

James West the younger, the only son of West and his wife Sarah Steavens, heiress of a wealthy timber merchant, died in 1795, predeceasing his mother. Alscot Park thereby passed to James West the younger's son, James Robert West, who died in 1838 and has passed down in the West family until the present day (2018). Currently occupied by Emma Holman-West and her family, the estate has been developed to house residential properties, offices, studios  and industrial space, winning the Bledisloe Gold Medal in 2011 from the Royal Agricultural Society for estate management.

References

Country houses in Warwickshire
Grade I listed buildings in Warwickshire